Aleksandar Mijatović (born September 20, 1982) is a Serbian former professional footballer, and current president of Sloga Kraljevo. He is a son of Serbian accordionist Miša Mijatović.

References

External links
 
 Aleksandar Mijatović stats at utakmica.rs

1982 births
Living people
Sportspeople from Kraljevo
Serbian footballers
Association football defenders
Red Star Belgrade footballers
FK Obilić players
FK Radnički 1923 players
FK Rad players
FK Bežanija players
Kallithea F.C. players
Expatriate footballers in Greece
FK Napredak Kruševac players
FK Banat Zrenjanin players
FK Vojvodina players
OFK Beograd players
FK Radnički Niš players
FK Kolubara players
RFK Novi Sad 1921 players
FK Sloga Kraljevo players
Serbian SuperLiga players